49th meridian may refer to:

49th meridian east, a line of longitude east of the Greenwich Meridian
49th meridian west, a line of longitude west of the Greenwich Meridian